Daniel Asenov (born 17 May 1997) is a Bulgarian boxer. He competed in the men's flyweight event at the 2016 Summer Olympics.

References

External links
 
 
 
 

1997 births
Living people
Bulgarian male boxers
Olympic boxers of Bulgaria
Boxers at the 2016 Summer Olympics
Boxers at the 2020 Summer Olympics
Boxers at the 2015 European Games
Boxers at the 2019 European Games
European Games medalists in boxing
European Games silver medalists for Bulgaria
Flyweight boxers
People from Yambol Province